Asmat Subregion is a subregion in the northwestern Anseba region (Zoba Anseba) of Eritrea. Its capital lies at Asmat.

References

Subregions of Eritrea

Subregions of Eritrea
Anseba Region